Paul Dwayne Brown (born June 18, 1941) is an American former professional baseball pitcher, who played in Major League Baseball (MLB) for the Philadelphia Phillies (1961–1963, 1968). He threw and batted right-handed.

Brown was born in Fort Smith, Arkansas, raised in Holdenville, Oklahoma, graduated from high school at Moss Public School, and attended the University of Oklahoma. His younger brother, Jackie Brown, was a big league pitcher and pitching coach. Paul Brown is the father of former minor-league hurler Daren Brown, who was the interim manager of the  Seattle Mariners and has been a manager or coach in the Seattle organization since 2001.

Brown spent all but seven games of his entire eight-year (1960–1965, 1967–1968) professional baseball career in the Phillies' system. In parts of four MLB seasons, he posted an 0–8 record, with a 6.00 earned run average (ERA), in 36 appearances, including 12 starts and one save. Brown surrendered 62 earned runs, on 108 hits, and 47 walks, while striking out 45, in 93 innings pitched.

When the Phillies invited Tommy John to spring training while they scouted him in 1961, John became friends with Brown. "He was an outstanding pitcher and a nice young man," John remembered.

See also
Philadelphia Phillies all-time roster

References

External links

1941 births
Living people
Arkansas Travelers players
Baseball players from Arkansas
Buffalo Bisons (minor league) players
Elmira Pioneers players
Jacksonville Suns players
Major League Baseball pitchers
Miami Marlins (FSL) players
People from Holdenville, Oklahoma
Philadelphia Phillies players
Reading Phillies players
San Diego Padres (minor league) players
Sportspeople from Fort Smith, Arkansas
Williamsport Grays players